Ecuador competed at the 2000 Summer Olympics in Sydney, Australia.

Jefferson Pérez, who won a gold medal at the 1996 Summer Olympics, won 4th place in the 20km walk.

Results and competitors by event

Athletics
Men's Marathon
 Silvio Guerra
 Final – 2:16.27 (→ 14th place)

Men's 20 km Road Walk
 Jefferson Pérez
 Final – 1:20.18 (→ 4th place)

Women's Marathon
 Martha Tenorio
 Final – 2:33.54 (→ 25th place)

Judo
Men's Extra-Lightweight
 Juan Barahona
Round One – Bye
Round Two – Lost to Gheorghe Kurgheleasvili (MDA)

Women's Heavyweight
 Carmen Chalá
Round One – Lost to Colleen Rosensteel (USA)

Shooting
Women's Air Pistol, 10 metres
 Carmen Malo
 21st place (tied)

Swimming
Men's 50m Freestyle
 Julio Santos
 Preliminary Heat – 22.83 (→ did not advance, 19th place)

Men's 100m Freestyle
 Felipe Delgado
 Preliminary Heat – 52.78 (→ did not advance, 56th place)

Men's 100m Butterfly
 Roberto Delgado
 Preliminary Heat – 56.07 (→ did not advance, 46th place)

Men's 200m Butterfly
 Roberto Delgado
 Preliminary Heat – 02:08.18 (→ did not advance, 43rd place)

Weightlifting

Men

See also
 Ecuador at the 1999 Pan American Games

References

Ecuador Olympic Committee
Wallechinsky, David (2004). The Complete Book of the Summer Olympics (Athens 2004 Edition). Toronto, Canada. .
International Olympic Committee (2001). The Results. Retrieved 12 November 2005.
Sydney Organising Committee for the Olympic Games (2001). Official Report of the XXVII Olympiad Volume 1: Preparing for the Games. Retrieved 20 November 2005.
Sydney Organising Committee for the Olympic Games (2001). Official Report of the XXVII Olympiad Volume 2: Celebrating the Games. Retrieved 20 November 2005.
Sydney Organising Committee for the Olympic Games (2001). The Results. Retrieved 20 November 2005.
International Olympic Committee Web Site
sports-reference

Nations at the 2000 Summer Olympics
2000 Summer Olympics
Summer Olympics